Victory Ford is a lead fictional character of the NBC sitcom/drama Lipstick Jungle, played by actress Lindsay Price. The character was created by Candace Bushnell, who published Lipstick Jungle and Sex and the City.

Character history
Victory was once the most celebrated up-and-coming fashion designer in the business, until the New York Times trashed her new Fall collection and subsequently she lost her financial backing, forcing her to fire all of her employees and work from her house. She must now pick up the pieces of her shattered life and rebuild her career, as she relies on her friends and the man in her life, businessman Joe Bennett (Andrew McCarthy), to help her get back on her feet.

Drama television characters